"A Holly Jolly Christmas" (also called "Have a Holly Jolly Christmas") is a Christmas song written by Johnny Marks and most famously performed by Burl Ives. The song has since become one of the top 25 most-performed "holiday" songs written by ASCAP members, for the first five years of the 21st century.

Background
"A Holly Jolly Christmas" was written by Johnny Marks in 1962. It was the title song of The Quinto Sisters' first album, Holly Jolly Christmas, recorded in June 1964 for Columbia Records, featuring guitarist Al Caiola with arrangements by Frank Hunter and Marty Manning.

The song was featured in the 1964 Rankin-Bass Christmas special, Rudolph the Red-Nosed Reindeer, in which Burl Ives voiced the narrator, Sam the Snowman. Originally to be sung by Larry D. Mann as Yukon Cornelius, the song, as well as "Silver and Gold", was given to Ives due to his singing fame. This version was also included on the soundtrack album.

The song was re-recorded by Ives and released in 1964 as a single and later featured the following year in his 1965 holiday album, Have a Holly Jolly Christmas. This version of the song has a somewhat slower arrangement than the Rudolph the Red-Nosed Reindeer version and features a twelve-string guitar solo introduction; it is this version that has since become the more commonly heard rendition on radio.  This song mentions mistletoe in the bridge, where the singer asks the younger lover to "Kiss her once for me". The song features a mixed-gender chorus, whose repeated "Ding-dong" imitation of Christmas bells are heard in the outro of the song, before it fades out.

The song's enduring popularity is evidenced by its reaching No. 30 on the Billboard Adult Contemporary chart in 1998, as well as No. 21 on the US Country Digital Songs chart and No. 5 on the Holiday 100 chart in 2011. The song charted on the Billboard Hot 100 for the first time in 2017, after rules on chart eligibility for older songs had been relaxed several years before, and reached a peak of No. 38.

On the week ending December 8, 2018, the song re-entered the Hot 100 chart. It reached No. 10 on the week ending January 5, 2019. On the week ending January 4, 2020, it reached a new peak of No. 4. With this feat, Ives now holds the record for the longest break between Hot 100 Top Tens as he returned to this minimum ranking after 56 years, seven months and two weeks since his previous Top 10 hit and, at 109 years after birth, surpassing Louis Armstrong's "What a Wonderful World" (which reached the Top 40 when Armstrong would have been 86 years old) as the oldest artist, living or deceased, to have a Top 40 hit. As of December 2019, Burl Ives' recording has sold 664,000 copies in the United States since becoming available for download in the digital era.

Chart performance

Burl Ives version

Weekly charts

Year-end charts

Alan Jackson version

Michael Bublé version

Lady Antebellum version

Jerrod Niemann version

Certifications

Burl Ives version

Michael Bublé version

Notes

References

External links
 All Music Guide A Holly Jolly Christmas - Burl Ives
 Lyrics link

1964 songs
American Christmas songs
Burl Ives songs
Decca Records singles
Lady A songs
Olivia Newton-John songs
Songs written by Johnny Marks
Johnny Mathis songs
Michael Bublé songs